Szabolcs Hajdu (born 26 January 1972) is a Hungarian actor and film director. He directed more than ten films since 1991.

Selected filmography

References

External links 
 

1972 births
Living people
Hungarian male film actors
Hungarian film directors